Dave Magnum (born December 25, 1962) is a former political candidate in Wisconsin.

He was born in Wisconsin Dells, Wisconsin. He attended the University of Wisconsin-Madison. Originally born with the last name Weiss, he was given the name Magnum after being hired at WIBA-FM in Madison, Wisconsin. He eventually legally changed his name.

Magnum has two children and resides in Pardeeville, Wisconsin. His wife, Lynn, died of breast cancer in 2002.

Political career
Magnum twice ran for the United States House of Representatives from Wisconsin's 2nd congressional district. First, in 2004 after defeating Ron Greer in the Republican primary. Second, in 2006 after having faced very little opposition in the primary election. He lost both times in the general election to incumbent Tammy Baldwin.

References

People from Wisconsin Dells, Wisconsin
Wisconsin Republicans
Candidates in the 2006 United States elections
21st-century American politicians
Candidates in the 2004 United States elections
University of Wisconsin–Madison alumni
1962 births
Living people
People from Pardeeville, Wisconsin